Christine Beatty (born 1970), Chief of Staff to Detroit Mayor Kwame Kilpatrick.

Christine or Chris Beatty  may also refer to:

Christine Beatty (activist) (born 1958), writer, musician and transgender activist
Chris Beatty (born 1973), American college football assistant coach